Novosyolovka is a rural locality in Platavsky Selsoviet Rural Settlement, Konyshyovsky District, Kursk Oblast, Russia. Population:

Geography 
The village is located on the Prutishche River in the basin of the Seym, 47 km from the Russia–Ukraine border, 74 km west of Kursk, 15 km south-west of the district center – the urban-type settlement Konyshyovka, 9.5 km from the selsoviet center – Kashara.

 Climate
Novosyolovka has a warm-summer humid continental climate (Dfb in the Köppen climate classification).

Transport 
Novosyolovka is located 47 km from the federal route  Ukraine Highway, 60 km from the route  Crimea Highway, 40 km from the route  (Trosna – M3 highway), 34 km from the road of regional importance  (Fatezh – Dmitriyev), 14.5 km from the road  (Konyshyovka – Zhigayevo – 38K-038), 14 km from the road  (Kursk – Lgov – Rylsk – border with Ukraine), 7.5 km from the road  (Lgov – Konyshyovka), on the road of intermunicipal significance  (Shustovo – Novosyolovka), 9.5 km from the nearest railway halt Maritsa (railway line Navlya – Lgov-Kiyevsky).

The rural locality is situated 80 km from Kursk Vostochny Airport, 159 km from Belgorod International Airport and 283 km from Voronezh Peter the Great Airport.

References

Notes

Sources

Rural localities in Konyshyovsky District